Iryna Oleksandrivna Yevsa (born October 15, 1956) is a Russian-language Ukrainian poet and translator. She lives in Kharkiv, Ukraine.

Biography 
Yevsa was born into a military family in Kharkiv, Ukraine SSR. She studied in the philological faculty at the National University of Kharkiv and graduated from Maxim Gorky Literature Institute in Moscow in 1981. Following her graduation, she worked at the Book Chamber of Ukraine from 1981-1986 and began working for the company Apis in 1988. She has recently worked for the National University of Kharkiv.

First published as a poet in 1975, Yevsa also translates literature from Armenian, Georgian, Polish, and Ukrainian into Russian. Her own work has been translated into Ukrainian, Azerbaijani, Armenian, Georgian, Lithuanian, and Serbian. She is a member of the National Writers' Union of Ukraine and PEN International.

Works

Poetry collections 

 1976, Отзвук (Echo)
 1978, Дыхание (Breath)
 1985, Август (August)
 1986, Сад (Garden)
 1986,  День седьмой (Day Seven)
 1995, Изгнание из рая (Exile from Paradise)
 1999, Наверное, снилось… (Probably Dreamed...)
 2000, Лодка на фаянсе (Boat on Faience)
 2015, Юго-Восток (South-East)

Translations and arrangements 
With the subtitle, "Modern Poetic Version of Iryna Yevsa"

 Faust, Johann Wolfgang von Goethe / translated by Nikolai Aleksandrovich Kholodkovskii
 Divine Comedy, Dante Alighieri. / translated by Dmytry Dmytryevich Minaev
 Paradise Lost and Paradise Regained, John Milton / translated by A. N. Shulgovskaya
 Rubaiyat, Omar Khayyam
 Short stories and poems, Edgar Allen Poe
 Works of Oscar Wilde
 Venus and Adonis, William Shakespeare
 Othello, William Shakespeare / interlinear notes by Pyotr Isaevich Weinberg
 The Rape of Lucrece, William Shakespeare
 Romeo and Juliet, William Shakespeare / interlinear notes by Apollon Aleksandrovich Grigoryev
 Hamlet, William Shakespeare / translated by Konstantin Konstantinovich
 King Lear, William Shakespeaere / translated by M. A. Kuzmina
 The Phoenix and the Turtle, William Shakespeare
 Orphic Hymns
 Song of Songs
 Psalms of David

In collaboration with A. K. Shaposhnikov

 Gathas, Zarathustra
 Selections from the work of Pythagoras
 The fragments of Sappho
 Selected fragments from the Seven Sages
 Book of the Dead
 Prophecies of Pythia and Sibyl

Awards 

 2000, named as a laureate for the International Foundation for the Memory of Boris Chichibabin
 2013, Paragraph anti-award in the category for "worst translation" criticizing her work translating out-of-copyright literary classics into Russian
 2015, Mykola Ushakov Prize for her work "Юго-Восток" ("South-East")
 2016, Russian Prize at the XIV Literary Festival Named after Maximilian Voloshin for her work  "Юго-Восток" ("South-East")

References

Russian-language poets
Ukrainian women poets
1956 births
Living people